Mark Kvamme (born February 20, 1961) is a venture capitalist at the firm Drive Capital in Columbus, Ohio and a sports car racing driver.

Business career
Kvamme founded Drive Capital with Chris Olsen in 2013. He currently sits on the board of Aver Informatics, FarmLogs, Clinc, Funny or Die, Gecko Robotics, Muve Health, Physna, and Udacity. He specializes in innovative technology, healthcare and consumer investments in the Midwest. Before Drive Capital, Kvamme was the interim chief investment officer and president of JobsOhio. Prior to JobsOhio, Kvamme was a partner at Sequoia Capital, the chairman and CEO of CKS Group, the director of international marketing at Wyse Technology, president and CEO of International Solutions and a founding member of Apple France.

Kvamme formerly worked as state development director in the administration of Ohio Governor John Kasich. In 2015, Kvamme donated $500,000 to Kasich's 2016 presidential campaign through the limited liability corporation MMWP12.

Racing career
Kvamme grew up in motorcycle racing, but did not pursue a career in it. After competing in off-road truck racing, he moved to sports cars, racing in the WeatherTech SportsCar Championship starting in 2014. In 2017, he placed Third at the Rolex 24hrs of Daytona in the Prototype Challenge class.  He also began competing in the Porsche GT3 Cup Challenge USA, and finished second in the Platinum Cup Masters championship with two wins (Barber Motorsports Park and Virginia International Raceway).

In late 2019, Kvamme joined Rick Ware Racing's Asian Le Mans Series program, where he shared the No. 52 Ligier JS P2 with Cody Ware. In their first race at Shanghai International Circuit, despite missing qualifying and only having two laps of practice, Ware and Kvamme finished second in the LMPS Am class and 14th overall.

Kvamme's team MDK Motorsports was also active in motocross during the early 2000s, and returned to the sport for the 2022 season of the reborn FIM World Supercross Championship.

Personal life
Kvamme is the son of E. Floyd Kvamme, a former entrepreneur and a venture capitalist at Kleiner Perkins Caufield & Byers. Apple France was created in 1982; as a "Founding Member", Kvamme was living in France at that time and working for Jean Louis Gassee.

Kvamme has a BA from the University of California, Berkeley.

Motorsports career results

Complete WeatherTech SportsCar Championship results
(key)(Races in bold indicate pole position, Results are overall/class)

Asian Le Mans Series results
(key) (Races in bold indicate pole position) (Races in italics indicate fastest lap)

Complete 24 Hours of Le Mans results

References

External links
 
 From Mass Media to Media for the Masses- Mark Kvamme at OMMA Global 2010
 GigaOm- Sequoia’s Kvamme: Social Media Marketing Can Replace Advertising
 OMMA Global on Mobile
 
 

Living people
American venture capitalists
University of California, Berkeley alumni
American racing drivers
24 Hours of Daytona drivers
WeatherTech SportsCar Championship drivers
Porsche Supercup drivers
American chief executives
1961 births
24H Series drivers
24 Hours of Le Mans drivers
Starworks Motorsport drivers
Asian Le Mans Series drivers
EuroInternational drivers
European Le Mans Series drivers
AF Corse drivers
Michelin Pilot Challenge drivers
Le Mans Cup drivers
Racing drivers from California
Racing drivers from San Jose, California
Sportspeople from San Jose, California